Frank W. Christopherson Jr. (May 24, 1927 – December 15, 2020) was an American politician.

Christopherson was a Democratic member of the Wisconsin Senate, representing the 25th district from 1963 to 1967. He also served in the Wisconsin Assembly from 1959 to 1963.

According to the Wisconsin Blue Book (1966), he was born in Superior, Wisconsin, and attended Superior State College. He worked as a train engineer and fireman, as well as a newspaper publisher. He served in the Army Air Corps during World War II. He was a county board member from 1956 to 1962.

Christopherson died at Maywood of Benedictine Assisted Living in Duluth, Minnesota.

References

County supervisors in Wisconsin
Democratic Party Wisconsin state senators
Democratic Party members of the Wisconsin State Assembly
1927 births
2020 deaths
Politicians from Superior, Wisconsin
University of Wisconsin–Superior alumni
Editors of Wisconsin newspapers
Military personnel from Wisconsin
United States Army Air Forces soldiers